Fakebook is the fourth studio album by American indie rock band Yo La Tengo, released in 1990 by record label Bar None.

Content 

Comprising eleven cover songs as well as five originals, this album is regarded as a departure from their previous albums due to it containing mostly folk songs. "Barnaby, Hardly Working" is a new version of the song featured in the previous album President Yo La Tengo. "Did I Tell You" is a new version of the song featured in the 1987 album New Wave Hot Dogs.

Track listing

Personnel
Ira Kaplan – vocals, acoustic guitar; electric guitar (tracks 6, 7, 12)
Dave Schramm – electric guitar, steel guitar, organ
Al Greller – double bass
Georgia Hubley – drums, vocals; organ (tracks 11, 14), electric guitar (track 8)
Additional Personnel
The Pussywillows – vocals (track 7)
Gene Holder – electric bass (track 10)
Peter Stampfel – violin and vocals (track 13)

References

External links 

 

1990 albums
Yo La Tengo albums
Covers albums
Bar/None Records albums